The USCF Grand Prix is a set of chess tournaments for prize money rated by the United States Chess Federation. In general, a tournament must have at least $300 in guaranteed prizes to award "Grand Prix" points.

At the end of the year, prizes are awarded to players with the most points. The first prize is usually $10,000.

These prizes provide incentives to grandmasters to play in small regional tournaments which they would otherwise avoid.

The Grand Prix of chess was started in the 1980s by Church's Chicken. As a result, the points awarded at these tournaments were called "chicken points" and the tournaments at which these points were awarded was called the "Chicken circuit".

As years passed, the sponsorship has changed. For several years the sponsor was Novag, a maker of chess computers. Currently, the sponsor is ChessCafe.

The late Grandmaster Igor V. Ivanov won the Grand Prix of chess nine times. In more recent years, the usual winner had been the late Grandmaster Aleksander Wojtkiewicz.

Also, recently, a Grand Prix for younger chess players has been started, through the online chess site World Chess Live, with online tournaments where players earn points based on how they do.

References

External links
 USCF Grand Prix standings

Chess competitions
Chess in the United States